Cristian Irimia (born 7 July 1981) is a retired Romanian footballer who played as a midfielder for Liga IV side Internațional Valea Iașului. In his career, Irimia also played for teams such as Sportul Studențesc, Rapid București, Dinamo București, Dynamo Kyiv and FC Voluntari.

References

External links

 
 Player profile on FFU official website
 Player profile on Sportul Studenţesc website 

1981 births
Living people
Footballers from Bucharest
Romanian footballers
Romanian expatriate footballers
FC Sportul Studențesc București players
FC Rapid București players
FC Dinamo București players
FC Dynamo Kyiv players
FC Voluntari players
Liga I players
Ukrainian Premier League players
Expatriate footballers in Ukraine
Romanian expatriate sportspeople in Ukraine
Association football defenders